The Prosthogonimidae are a family of trematodes. They are part of the huge of the suborder Plagiorchiata in the order Plagiorchiida. The adults of these parasites occur in the bursa of Fabricius, caecum, cloaca, liver, oviduct and sometimes even under the nictitating membrane of vertebrates and particularly birds.

Selected genera are:
 Cephalotrema
 Mediogonimus Woodhead & Malewitz, 1936
 Ophthalmogonimus
 Prosthogonimus Lühe, 1899
 previously recognized genus Schistogonimus Lühe, 1909 is newly considered a junior synonym of Prosthogonimus Lühe, 1899

References 

Trematode families
Plagiorchiida
Parasites of birds